Banks County is a county located in the northeastern part of the U.S. state of Georgia. As of the 2020 census, the population was 18,035, down from 18,395 in 2010. The county seat is Homer. The Old Banks County Courthouse is located in Homer and listed on the National Register of Historic Places. A new county courthouse was constructed adjacent to the old one in 1983.

History
The law to establish Banks County was passed by the Georgia General Assembly on December 11, 1858. It was named for Dr. Richard E. Banks.  The legislation called for the creation of Banks County on February 1, 1859, from Franklin and Habersham counties.

Ty Cobb, a Baseball Hall of Famer, was born in Banks County in 1886 in an area of the county known as The Narrows - a small farming community consisting of fewer than 100 people. The area and birthplace are on State Highway 105 in the northern part of the county near the Broad River. The legal organ for the county is The Banks County News, a member of Mainstreet News, Inc. One of the county's oldest church sites is the Hebron Presbyterian Church, established in 1796. Banks County is the home of the Atlanta Dragway, located near Banks Crossing. Banks County is also known for being the home of the former world's largest Easter egg hunt. (The 50th annual egg hunt in 2009 was the last in the series.)

Geography
Banks County is entirely located in the Broad River sub-basin of the Savannah River basin.

Major highways

  Interstate 85
  U.S. Route 441
  State Route 15
  State Route 51
  State Route 52
  State Route 59
  State Route 63
  State Route 98
  State Route 105
  State Route 164
  State Route 184
  State Route 198
  State Route 323
  State Route 326
  State Route 403 (hidden designation for I-85)

Adjacent counties
 Habersham County - north
 Stephens County - northeast
 Madison County - southeast
 Jackson County - south
 Hall County - west
 Franklin County - east

National protected area
 Chattahoochee National Forest (part)

Demographics

2000 census
As of the census of 2000, there were 14,422 people, 5,364 households, and 4,162 families living in the county.  The population density was 62 people per square mile (24/km2).  There were 5,808 housing units at an average density of 25 per square mile (10/km2).  The racial makeup of the county was 93.16% White, 3.22% Black or African American, 0.30% Native American, 0.60% Asian, 0.06% Pacific Islander, 1.96% from other races, and 0.71% from two or more races.  3.42% of the population were Hispanic or Latino of any race.

There were 5,364 households, out of which 35.60% had children under the age of 18 living with them, 65.40% were married couples living together, 7.90% had a female householder with no husband present, and 22.40% were non-families. 19.20% of all households were made up of individuals, and 7.70% had someone living alone who was 65 years of age or older.  The average household size was 2.69 and the average family size was 3.06.

In the county, the population was spread out, with 26.20% under the age of 18, 8.90% from 18 to 24, 30.70% from 25 to 44, 23.70% from 45 to 64, and 10.50% who were 65 years of age or older.  The median age was 35 years. For every 100 females there were 102.00 males.  For every 100 females age 18 and over, there were 99.70 males.

The median income for a household in the county was $38,523, and the median income for a family was $43,136. Males had a median income of $29,986 versus $21,698 for females. The per capita income for the county was $17,424.  About 9.80% of families and 12.50% of the population were below the poverty line, including 14.00% of those under age 18 and 16.30% of those age 65 or over.

2010 census
As of the 2010 United States census, there were 18,395 people, 6,700 households, and 5,100 families living in the county. The racial makeup of the county was 91.7% white, 2.3% black or African American, 0.9% Asian, 0.3% American Indian, 3.3% from other races, and 1.4% from two or more races. Those of Hispanic or Latino origin made up 5.7% of the population. In terms of ancestry, 18.7% were American, 8.5% were Irish, and 8.5% were English.

Of the 6,700 households, 36.8% had children under the age of 18 living with them, 60.6% were married couples living together, 10.2% had a female householder with no husband present, 23.9% were non-families, and 20.2% of all households were made up of individuals. The average household size was 2.75 and the average family size was 3.14. The median age was 38.4 years.

The median income for a household in the county was $40,455 and the median income for a family was $48,606. Males had a median income of $41,444 versus $26,998 for females. The per capita income for the county was $19,497. About 13.0% of families and 15.9% of the population were below the poverty line, including 15.9% of those under age 18 and 16.6% of those age 65 or over.

2020 census

As of the 2020 United States Census, there were 18,035 people, 6,740 households, and 4,875 families residing in the county.

Education

The Banks County School District is a public school district that services Banks County, and is based in Homer. There are four schools in the district, which educate 2,788 students in kindergarten through 12th grade.

Communities

Cities
 Baldwin (partly in Habersham)
 Commerce (partly in Jackson)
 Gillsville (partly in Hall)
 Lula (partly in Hall)

Towns
 Alto (partly in Habersham)
 Homer
 Maysville (partly in Jackson)

Unincorporated communities
 Hollingsworth
 Narrows

See also

 National Register of Historic Places listings in Banks County, Georgia
List of counties in Georgia

References

External links

 GeorgiaInfo.com Banks County History
 This Day in Georgia History: October 23, Ed Jackson and Charly Pou, Carl Vinson Institute of Government, The University of Georgia
 History information from Official Banks County website
 Ty Cobb Bio on visitnortheastgeorgia.com
 National Baseball Hall of Fame Ty Cobb Bio
 Mainstreet Newspapers
 Banks County historical marker
 Leatherwood Baptist Church historical marker
 Line Baptist Church historical marker
 Mt. Pleasant Church historical marker
 Nails Creek Baptist Church historical marker

 
1859 establishments in Georgia (U.S. state)
Populated places established in 1859
Georgia (U.S. state) counties
Northeast Georgia
Counties of Appalachia